In taxonomy, Acidianus is a genus of the Sulfolobaceae.

See also
 List of bacterial genera named after mythological figures

References

Further reading

Scientific journals

Scientific books

Scientific databases

External links

Acidianus at BacDive -  the Bacterial Diversity Metadatabase

Archaea genera
Thermoproteota